The Vietnam Era Veterans' Readjustment Assistance Act of 1974 (or VEVRAA) is an Act of Congress originally about Vietnam-era veterans, disabled veterans, and any other veterans who served active duty time in a war event that qualifies for a campaign badge.

Overview
The law requires that employers with federal contracts or subcontracts of $150,000 or more provide equal opportunity and affirmative action for Vietnam-era veterans, special disabled veterans, and veterans who served on active duty during a war or in a campaign or expedition for which a campaign badge has been authorized.

If covered by the act, a veteran who believes to have been discriminated against may file a complaint, which can be filed with the Office of Federal Contract Compliance Programs or with a local Veteran's Employment Representative at the local state employment services office.

A Vietnam era veteran was defined as a person who:
 Served on active duty for more than 180 days, any part of which occurred between August 5, 1964, and May 7, 1975, and did not receive a dishonorable discharge;
 Was discharged/released from active duty for a service-connected disability if any part of such active duty was performed between August 5, 1964, and May 7, 1975;
 Served on active duty for more than 180 days, as well as served in the Republic of Vietnam between February 28, 1961, and May 7, 1975.

The law now applies to any veteran who served on active duty during a war, including the Vietnam War and the Gulf War, which is defined as beginning on August 2, 1990, with no fixed end date.

A special disabled veteran is a person who is entitled to compensation under laws administered by the Department of Veterans Affairs for a disability rated at 30 percent or more. If it has been determined that the individual has a serious employment disability, or was discharged/released from active duty because of a service-connected disability, that changes to 10 or 20 percent.

As a part of affirmative action, federal contractors and subcontractors are required to list with the local state employment service all employment openings except for executive and top management jobs, jobs which the contractor expects to fill from within, and jobs lasting 3 days or less.

References

External links 
 Text of the Vietnam Era Veterans' Readjustment Assistance Act, as amended

93rd United States Congress
1974 in law
Anti-discrimination law in the United States
History of veterans' affairs in the United States
United States federal labor legislation
United States federal legislation articles without infoboxes
United States federal veterans' affairs legislation